David Allen Ogden Stiers (October 31, 1942 – March 3, 2018) was an American actor and conductor. He appeared in numerous productions on Broadway, and originated the role of Feldman in The Magic Show, in which he appeared for four years between 1974 and 1978.

In 1977, he was cast as Major Charles Emerson Winchester III, M.D., on the television series M*A*S*H, a role he portrayed until the series' conclusion in 1983, and which earned him two Emmy Award nominations. He appeared prominently in the 1980s in the role of District Attorney Michael Reston in several Perry Mason television films, and voiced a number of Disney characters during the 1990s and 2000s, including Cogsworth in 1991's Beauty and the Beast, Governor Ratcliffe and Wiggins in 1995's Pocahontas, Kamaji in 2001's Spirited Away, and Dr. Jumba Jookiba in the Lilo & Stitch franchise. He appeared in television again on the supernatural drama series The Dead Zone as Reverend Gene Purdy, a role he portrayed from 2002 to 2007.

Stiers continued to contribute voice work for films and television productions in his later years, narrating M. Night Shyamalan's Lady in the Water (2006) and having a recurring role on the animated series Regular Show. Stiers spent his later years as a conductor of the Newport Symphony Orchestra.

Early life 
David Allen Ogden Stiers was born at St. Francis Hospital in Peoria, Illinois, on October 31st 1942, the son of Margaret Elizabeth (née Ogden) and Kenneth Truman Stiers, and grew up in Peoria Heights, Chillicothe, and Urbana, Illinois. His family moved to Eugene, Oregon, where he graduated from North Eugene High School, and briefly attended the University of Oregon before enrolling at the Juilliard School in New York City, from which he graduated in 1972.

Stiers subsequently moved to San Francisco, where he performed with the California Shakespeare Theater, San Francisco Actors Workshop, and the improv group The Committee, whose members included Rob Reiner, Howard Hesseman, and Peter Bonerz. In California, he worked for the Santa Clara Shakespeare Festival for seven years. Stiers relocated to New York City in the 1960s to study at the Juilliard School (Drama Division Group 1: 1968–1972). During his studies, Stiers was mentored by actor John Houseman, whose City Center Acting Company he later joined.

Career

Early acting credits 
Stiers first appeared in the Broadway production The Magic Show in 1974 in the minor role of Feldman. This was followed by several other Broadway productions, including The Three Sisters and The Beggar's Opera. Subsequent early credits included roles on the television series The Mary Tyler Moore Show, Kojak, and Rhoda. Stiers also appeared in the pilot of Charlie's Angels as the team's chief backup. He also appeared as a teacher the 1977 television film A Circle of Children, about a school for special needs children.

M*A*S*H (1977–1983) 

In 1977, Stiers joined the cast of the CBS sitcom M*A*S*H. As Major Charles Emerson Winchester III, Stiers filled the void created by the departure of actor Larry Linville's Frank Burns character. In contrast to the buffoonish Burns, Winchester was articulate and socially sophisticated, and a highly talented surgeon who presented a very different type of foil to Alan Alda's Hawkeye Pierce and Mike Farrell's B.J. Hunnicutt. Burns usually served as the butt of practical jokes instigated by Pierce or Hunnicutt, was frequently inundated by insults for which he had no comebacks, and was often harshly criticized for his surgical skills. Winchester, however, presented a challenge to his colleagues' displays of irreverence, since his surgical skills could match or even outshine their own and, when it came to pranks and insults, he frequently outmanoeuvred his opponent; his patrician manner and aversion to puerile behavior served as the target for his fellow surgeons' barbs and jokes. At times, however, Winchester could align himself with Pierce and Hunnicutt, and the occasional tantrum aside, held considerable admiration for his commanding officer, Harry Morgan's Colonel Sherman T. Potter. For his portrayal of the pompous but emotionally complex Boston aristocrat, Stiers received two Emmy Award nominations.

Other television work 
After M*A*S*H  completed its run in 1983, Stiers made guest appearances on the television shows North and South;  Star Trek: The Next Generation; Murder, She Wrote; Matlock; Touched by an Angel; Wings; ALF and Frasier, along with a regular role in the first season of Two Guys, a Girl and a Pizza Place as Mr. Bauer. In 1984, he portrayed United States Olympic Committee founder William Milligan Sloane in the NBC miniseries The First Olympics: Athens 1896 for which he received another Emmy nomination. Beginning in 1985, Stiers made his first of eight appearances in Perry Mason television filmas District Attorney Michael Reston. He appeared in two unsuccessful television projects, Love & Money and Justice League of America (as Martian Manhunter). He also played Uncle Teddy Quinn (brother of Dr. Mike's father) in Dr. Quinn Medicine Woman.  He played a world renowned concert pianist.  In 2002, Stiers started a recurring role as the Reverend Purdy on the successful USA Network series The Dead Zone with Anthony Michael Hall. In 2006, he was cast as the recurring character Oberoth in Stargate Atlantis.

Voice acting 
Stiers provided voice work for dozens of film and television projects. His first work was on one of George Lucas's earliest films, the critically acclaimed THX 1138, in which he was incorrectly billed as "David Ogden Steers".  Stiers voiced PBS documentary films such as Ric Burns's project New York: A Documentary Film, 2010 Peabody Award winner The Lord is Not on Trial Here Today, and several episodes of the documentary television series American Experience, including Ansel Adams (2002), also directed by Ric Burns. He voiced Mr. Piccolo in the animated English-dubbed version of Studio Ghibli's 1992 film Porco Rosso, as well as Kamaji in the English dub of the studio's 2001 film Spirited Away. He collaborated with Disney on eight animated features, including 1991's Beauty and the Beast (as Cogsworth, also providing the opening narration), 1995's Pocahontas (as Governor Ratcliffe and Wiggins), 1996's The Hunchback of Notre Dame (as the Archdeacon), 2001's Atlantis: The Lost Empire (as Mr. Harcourt), and 2002's Lilo & Stitch (as Jumba Jookiba). He reprised a number of his Disney roles for various sequels, most notably with Jumba in Lilo & Stitch's three sequel films (2003's Stitch! The Movie, 2005's Lilo & Stitch 2: Stitch Has a Glitch, and 2006's Leroy & Stitch) and Lilo & Stitch: The Series.

He lent his voice to the direct-to-video Batman: Mystery of the Batwoman (2003) as the Penguin. Stiers did voice work for Solovar in a two-part episode, "The Brave and The Bold" of Justice League and voiced Solovar again in a Justice League Unlimited episode "Dead Reckoning". He voiced Mr. Jolly from Teacher's Pet. He voiced the king and prime minister in the 2004 short film The Cat That Looked at a King. In Hoodwinked (2005), Stiers voiced the role of Nicky Flippers, the frog detective who is dispatched to Granny's house. He voiced Pops's father, Mr. Maellard, in the animated TV series Regular Show, which debuted in 2010. Stiers had voices in several video games, including Icewind Dale, Kingdom Hearts II, Kingdom Hearts: Birth by Sleep, as Jeff Zandi in Uru: Ages Beyond Myst, and as Esher in Myst V: End of Ages.

Stiers was the reader for numerous audiobook versions of novels, including Tom Wolfe's A Man in Full (1998), and Colleen McCullough's The First Man in Rome.

Music 
Though he had no formal musical training, Stiers was the associate conductor of the Newport (Oregon) Symphony Orchestra and the Ernest Bloch Music Festival. He also played a major role in establishing the Newport Symphony. He also guest-conducted over 70 orchestras around the world, including the Oregon Mozart Players, the Vancouver Symphony, the Virginia Symphony, the Oregon Chamber Players, and the Yaquina (Oregon) Chamber Orchestra, as well as orchestras in San Francisco, San Diego, Los Angeles, Chicago, and Toronto.

Stiers traced his love of music back to a performance by George Szell and the Cleveland Orchestra on the basketball court at the University of Oregon in the 1950s. During his days at Juilliard, he would skip his acting classes to sit in on master classes led by such notables as John Williams, Pierre Boulez, and Sir Georg Solti.

Stiers also performed as Reverend Brock in the 2000 revival of the Broadway musical 'Tenderloin' by New York City Center’s Encores! series.

Personal life and death 
Stiers never married and came out as gay in 2009.

Stiers died at his home in Newport, Oregon, on March 3, 2018, at the age of 75, from complications related to bladder cancer. His will made provisions for bequests to several arts organizations in his area, including the Newport Symphony, Newport Public Library, and the Oregon Coast Council for the Arts, among others.

Filmography

Film

Television

Video games

Stage credits

Awards and nominations

References

External links 

1942 births
2018 deaths
20th-century American male actors
21st-century American male actors
Actors from Peoria, Illinois
American conductors (music)
American male conductors (music)
American male film actors
American male stage actors
American male television actors
American male voice actors
American male video game actors
Audiobook narrators
Disney people
Deaths from bladder cancer
Deaths from cancer in Oregon
Male actors from Eugene, Oregon
American gay actors
LGBT people from Illinois
Illinois Democrats
Oregon Democrats
Juilliard School alumni
Male actors from Illinois
Musicians from Peoria, Illinois
People from Chillicothe, Illinois
People from Peoria County, Illinois
People from Urbana, Illinois
University of Oregon alumni
Classical musicians from Illinois
People from Newport, Oregon